Krzywe Kolano  (translation: Askew knee) is a village in the administrative district of Gmina Jeziora Wielkie, Mogilno County, Kuyavian-Pomeranian Voivodeship, Poland.

References

Krzywe Kolano